Armadale is an inner suburb in Melbourne, Victoria, Australia, 7 km south-east of Melbourne's Central Business District, located within the City of Stonnington local government area. Armadale recorded a population of 9,368 at the 2021 census.

The suburb has its own railway station, as well as Toorak railway station, which is also in Armadale. It is bordered by Glenferrie Road to the east, Orrong Road to the west, Malvern Road to the north and Dandenong Road/Princes Highway to the south.

History

Armadale is named after Armadale, Sutherland in Scotland. This was because one of Armadale notable residents, James Munro, 15th Premier of Victoria, was born in Armadale, Sutherland. Armadale Post Office on High Street opened on 2 October 1884. The Armadale North Post Office, near Toorak Station, opened in 1940.

Demographics

In the 2016 census, there were 9,054 people in Armadale. 64.5% of people were born in Australia. The next most common countries of birth were England 3.3%, India 3.0%, China 2.2%, New Zealand 2.0% and Greece 1.2%. 73.5% of people only spoke English at home. Other languages spoken at home included Greek 2.7%, Mandarin 2.4% and Gujarati 1.1%. The most common responses for religion were No Religion 33.5%, Catholic 18.8% and Anglican 14.2%.

Today

The suburb, which borders Toorak, long regarded Melbourne's top suburb, is considered one of Melbourne's premier blue chip areas, with High Street, its main thoroughfare, containing high-end antique and fashion stores and hair salons. Glenferrie Road, a divider between Armadale and neighbouring suburb Malvern, is well known for its shopping and restaurants. Armadale contains and is in close proximity to a number of Melbourne's leading private schools, including Lauriston Girls' School and the King David School. Armadale also contains a number of parks, including Toorak Park, Victory Square Reserve, Armadale Reserve and the Union Street Gardens.

Notable citizens
 Forbes Carlile – Olympics swimming coach was born in Armadale in 1921.
 Joe Habbaki – Owner Toni & Guy Armadale, international award winning Hairdresser.
 Missy Higgins – Singer-songwriter who attended Armadale Primary School.
 Ross Higgins – Actor, best known for his role as Ted Bulpitt in the television series Kingswood Country was born in Armadale in 1931.
 Edith Ingpen, a private and state Government architect, born in Armadale.
 John Jost – The Age Political Correspondent and ABC 7.30 Host
 Sam Loxton – Test cricketer who attended Armadale Public School.
 Sir Eric Pearce – Channel 9 Newsreader
 Sir John Spicer – Attorney General.
 Richard Stubbs – radio personality
 Trevor Vincent – Commonwealth games gold medalist
 Leonie Wood – Journalist with The Age, lives in Armadale.

See also
 City of Malvern – Parts of Armadale were previously within this former local government area.
 City of Prahran – Parts of Armadale were previously within this former local government area.

References

External links
Australian Places – Armadale

Suburbs of Melbourne
Suburbs of the City of Stonnington